Diporiphora bilineata, the northern two-line dragon or two-lined dragon, is a species of agama found in Australia and Papua New Guinea.

References

Diporiphora
Agamid lizards of Australia
Taxa named by John Edward Gray
Reptiles described in 1842